The National Highway 70, or the N-70, is one of the National Highways of Pakistan. It runs from the city of Multan in Punjab to the town of Qilla Saifullah via Dera Ghazi Khan, and Loralai in Balochistan province. Its total length is  divided into  in Balochistan and the remaining  in the Punjab. It is  maintained and operated by Pakistan's National Highway Authority.

The N-70 runs in between the mighty Sulaiman Mountains, lush green farmlands of Multan and Dera Ghazi Khan's districts, and you may also experience the fascinating sceneries of MusaKhel, Makhter region, and empty and beautiful areas from Loralai to Qilla Saifullah.

Route
The highway starts right after the junction of N-5 in the suburbs of Multan and runs towards Muzaffargarh after crossing river Chenab and then river Indus to enter D.G Khan. After D.G Khan it starts ascending on Sulemaan range and through Girdu Pass and Fort Munro it enters in Balochistan. The first town in Balochistan province is Rakni and then goes to Makhter region after passing long MusaKhel region and then Loralai and finally ends near Qilla Saifullah at the junction of N-50.

See also 
 Motorways of Pakistan
 Transport in Pakistan
 Motorway M10 Pakistan (Quetta - Multan Motorway)

References

External links
 National Highway Authority

Roads in Pakistan
Roads in Punjab, Pakistan
Roads in Muzaffargarh
Transport in Muzaffargarh